The Tenakihi Range is a small subrange of the Swannell Ranges of the Omineca Mountains, located between Mesilinka River and Osilinka River in northern British Columbia, Canada.

References

Tenakihi Range in the Canadian Mountain Encyclopedia

Swannell Ranges